Avnet may refer to:

 Avnet, Inc., American electronics distributor company
 Charles Avnet (1888–1979), American businessman and founder of Avnet, Inc.
 Jon Avnet (b. 1949), American director, writer, and producer